Henry Wallop was an English statesman.

Henry Wallop may also refer to:

Henry Wallop (died 1642)
Henry Wallop (died 1794)